The small crow (Corvus samarensis) is a passerine bird in the genus Corvus of the family Corvidae. It was previously considered a subspecies of the slender-billed crow (Corvus enca), but phylogenetic evidence indicates that both are distinct species, and it has thus been split by the International Ornithologists' Union.

It is endemic to the Philippines. Its natural habitats are subtropical or tropical moist lowland forest and subtropical or tropical mangrove forest.

It has two subspecies, one found in the northern Philippines and one found in the south:

 C. s. sierramadrensis - endemic to Luzon in the northern Philippines
 C. s. samarensis - found on Samar and Mindanao in the southern Philippines

References

small crow
Endemic birds of the Philippines
small crow
small crow